is a Japanese video game development studio, whose staff consists of programmers who have previously worked on the Dragon Quest series of video games.

History
Genius Sonority was incorporated in June 2002 for the original purpose of developing Pokémon games for home consoles, with funding provided by Nintendo president Hiroshi Yamauchi’s Q Fund, a cash reserve used for Nintendo game company start-ups. Current shareholders of the company include Yamana Satoru, Nintendo, and The Pokémon Company. The company's founder and current president, Manabu Yamana, is best known as a key person at Heartbeat, a company that developed games in the Dragon Quest series for Enix. Yamana was joined in his efforts by members of Creatures Inc., the second-party Nintendo subsidiary responsible for the EarthBound series.

As well as developing various Pokémon-related titles, they also co-developed Dragon Quest Swords: The Masked Queen and the Tower of Mirrors for the Wii with Eighting. The game was released in Japan in July 2007, and the rest of the world within ten months.

Titles

References

External links
  

Video game companies established in 2002
Japanese companies established in 2002
Video game companies of Japan
Nintendo divisions and subsidiaries
Video game development companies